The IIL IS-5 was a single seat, high performance sailplane designed by Iosif Șilimon and built in Romania in 1960.

Design and development
From about 1950 to his death in February 1981, Iosif Silimon was Romania's most prominent glider designer, his aircraft distinguished by his initials.  The IS-5 first flew on 14 June 1960.  It was a shoulder wing cantilever monoplane developed from the URMV-3 IS-3 and of mixed wood and metal construction. The wings had an all wood structure and were plywood skinned. Mounted with 3° of dihedral, they were straight tapered in plan and  built around a single spar with a forward torsion box between it and the leading edge.  The tips carried the small streamlined bodies known as salmons, common at the time.  The slotted ailerons, which filled about half the span, were ply skinned but with an outer fabric covering.

The IS-5's pod and boom style fuselage was a metal monocoque with the pod ending abruptly at the wing trailing edge and a slender boom aft. The cockpit was enclosed by a single piece, side hinged, moulded perspex canopy. The empennage was conventional, with a ply covered fin which was narrow at the top but faired into the boom above and below. It carried a fabric covered, rounded, unbalanced rudder, broad at its heel, as well as the straight edged tailplane placed just above the boom. There were rounded, spring balanced elevators with gaps at their roots to clear the fin and a small cut out for rudder movement; these control surfaces were ply skinned and fabric covered like the ailerons.

The IS-5 had a short, rubber sprung skid under the cockpit and a fixed, unsprung monowheel under the wing, fitted with a brake.  There was also a small extension of the fin to act as a tail bumper.

Specifications

References

External links
NACA 23015 airfoil
NACA 23012 airfoil

1960s Romanian sailplanes
Aircraft first flown in 1960
Shoulder-wing aircraft